Le Pas du Chat Noir (The Black Cat's Paw) is an album by Tunisian oud player Anouar Brahem recorded in 2001 and released with the ECM Records label.

Reception 
The Allmusic review by Chris Nickson awarded the album 4 stars stating "The interplay between musicians is as delicate as lace -- thoughtful, with everyone listening as much as playing. It's a record with many moments of great beauty".

Track listing
All compositions by Anouar Brahem
 "Le Pas du Chat Noir" - 7:51   
 "De Tout Ton Cœur" - 7:38   
 "Leila au Pays du Carrousel" - 6:33   
 "Pique-nique à Nagpur" - 4:11   
 "C'est Ailleurs" - 8:02   
 "Toi qui Sait" - 5:56   
 "L'arbre qui Voit" - 6:07   
 "Un Point Bleu" - 1:44   
 "Les Ailes du Bourak" - 4:52   
 "Rue du Départ" - 6:00   
 "Leila au Pays du Carrousel (Variation)" - 5:36   
 "Déjà la Nuit" - 5:10  
Recorded at Radio DRS in Zurich, Switzerland in July 2001

Personnel
Anouar Brahem - oud
François Couturier - piano
Jean-Louis Matinier - accordion

References

2002 albums
ECM Records albums
Anouar Brahem albums
Albums produced by Manfred Eicher